In Dependence is a novel written by British-Nigerian author Sarah Ladipo Manyika. Her first novel, it was originally published by Legend Press, London, in 2008.

Background 
According to Manyika, "she conducted a "huge amount" of research so as to convey the reality of living in Nigeria at that time, including reading back issues of local magazines and newspapers to capture the zeitgeist." In Dependence was first published in 2008 by Legend Press in London. In 2009, it was published by Cassava Republic in Nigeria. In 2014, In Dependence was published by Weaver Press in Zimbabwe, where it is a set book for the Advanced-level English Literature examination.

Plot
The story starts in the early 1960s, a young Tayo sails from Nigeria to England to pursue a scholarship at Oxford University. He sees himself as one of a generation filled with ideas of a new and better future in this city of dreaming spires. The globe seemed to be on fire with change: domestic independence, the Civil Rights movement, and the first tremors of cultural and sexual upheavals.

The love story begins when Tayo meets Vanessa Richardson, the lovely daughter of a retired officer, at this point. The heroic but bittersweet love story of Tayo and Vanessa. It is the narrative of two individuals trying to figure out who they are and who they want to be; it is a journey of romance and idealism, strength and deceit, and the universal yearning to fall madly and completely in love.

Characters
Omotayo Oluwakayode Ajayi / TY - scholarship student at Oxford University.

Vanessa Richardson  - The white lady Tayo fell in love with. Vanessa is also a student at Oxford University.

Modupe - Tayo's teenage lover before leaving Nigeria and going to Oxford University.

Inspector Adeniyi Ajayi - Tayo's father

Mrs Elizabeth Richardson - Vanessa's mother

Mr Jonathan Richardson - Vanessa's father

Bisi - Tayo's sister

Remi - Tayo's brother

Mr Edward Maximilian Barker - The one who welcomed Omotayo prior to the letter given to Tayo by Mr Faircliff.

Mrs Isabella Barker/Isabella - Wife of Mr Barker

Uncle Bolu/Uncle B - Tayo’s uncle who loved drinking and women.

Miss Christine Arinze - the ex-girlfriend of Tayo and also dated Ike. She studied Modern Languages at St. Hilda College, Oxford

Mr and Mrs winter - They bailed Tunde, Tayo and Yusuf when they were arrested

Joy Williams - The black woman Yusuf married

Salamatou - a hairstylist in Dakar, Senegal

Jean Luc - A French who had promised to marry Salamatou but ran away after he learned that she was pregnant.

 Miriam - A nurse and Tayo's wife. She treated Tayo's father and became pregnant for Tayo. She married Tayo and gave birth to Kemi.

Kemi - Daughter of Tayo and Miriam

Suleiman - Salamatou's son thus Venessa's adopted son.

Abdou - Driver. He had taken Tayo to the airport before an accident occur.

Danjuma - Gardener. He had a secret affair with Vanessa's mother.

Professor John Harris - He is the man from the university whom Kemi introduced to his father.

Reception 
Toni Kan writes in The Lagos Review: "Sarah Manyika has written an impressive debut novel which will find a well deserved place in the pantheon of post-colonial literature." In Dependence has also been introduced by the Joint Admissions and Matriculation Board (JAMB) in Nigeria for candidates sitting for the 2017 UTME. Bustle listed it as one of the five books by African authors during the #ReadAfricaWeek.

Bibliography

References 

2008 Nigerian novels
Cassava Republic Press books
Novels set in Nigeria
Novels set in the 1960s
Postcolonial novels
Nigerian English-language novels
Novels set during the Nigerian Civil War